Blá Blá Blá is the third studio album released by Brazilian girl group Rouge on June 16, 2004 by Columbia Records. The album is the first of the group like quartet, marking the absence of member Luciana Andrade. In this work, the Rouge bet in a more aggressive and mature pop, being considered the preferred album among the members. After having few to no writing credits on their previous two studio albums, in Blá Blá Blá brings the four members of the group writing two songs in partnership with Milton Guedes and Rick Bonadio, and Fantine and Karin have written a song by themselves; the repertoire also brings Bonadio's original compositions, alone or together with Fúlvio Márcio, Clio, Beto Paciello and Guedes. The album features versions of three songs previously released by other artists, plus four songs composed in English and the group's record company, Sony Music, brought the group to record with exclusivity.

Blá Blá Blá is characterized by a combination of pop rock and dance-pop, present in several songs. From the album, four singles were taken: "Blá Blá Blá", "Sem Você" (which became the most successful songs on the album), "Vem Dançar" and "Pá Pá Lá Lá" (who achieved more modest success). Music critics welcomed the album positively, highlighting the more mature compositions on the album, and praised the style adopted on the album. The song "Vermelho, A Cor do Amor" was positively received by its lyrics, and "Por Onde Quer Que Eu Vá" was highlighted by the group's vocal performance. Blá Blá Blá sold more than 135,000 copies, and issued a gold certification through the Associação Brasileira dos Produtores de Discos. To promote the album, the group made an intense publicity in TV series, in addition to having initiated the Tour Blá Blá Blá (2004-2005). The album also features an extra computer track that opens as a CD-ROM. That same year, the group received the Best Band Award by the Academia Brasileira de Letras.

Background
After the success of their second album, C'est La Vie (2003), on February 11, 2004, Luciana Andrade officially announced her disbandment from the group. "Nothing in life is just roses. There's a moment that we need to change. I felt this very strong these times. I am in peace with my decision. Each one will follow its own road", she said. According to sources, the singer left the band due to overworking — there were days the girls had a 20-hour schedule — and low payment. As for others, including a statement by the singer herself, her departure "was a matter of musical ideology. There came a time when her work in the group wasn't fulfilling her wishes", the singer's husband said. "Rouge will go on with four energy-filled girls," affirmed Elisabetta Zenatti, their manager. "It's a big change. Rouge is one. You can't introduce a new member. This reflects in our work. We chose to continue our history as well", Fantine added.

Development and songs

With the departure of Luciana, the group announced during the same press conference, that between May and June the band's third album would be released. "The group will come back renewed, with new ballads and new concepts of shows," said the businesswoman Elisabetta Zenatti. After the carnival, the group slowed down to work on the new album and recording music videos. "Luciana will not have any participation in the third album, which means that we will have to work hard, but the group will not lose quality with her departure," said Patrícia Lissa.

Blá Blá Blá is a bit different from the previous albums of the group, which focused on a more pop, dance and zouk sound, in this project the group focused on a more mature sound with plenty of pop rock and dance-pop and elements of other styles, with more serious lyrics. "It's still pop and eclectic, but it's more connected to the roots of influences. "Eu Quero Acreditar" and "Se Liga Se Toca" is pop rock, "Filme de Terror" is hardcore and "Na Palma da Mão" has a Afro-Brazilian beat, explains Fantine Thó. The latter, by the way, is authored by the band itself, and the first composition to be recorded by Rouge on an album. "It was a joke at Karin's house, we did not do it with the intention of recording," recalls Aline Wirley. The responsibility for recording the first composition was not born by the group. "We really trust our producer (Rick Bonadio), and he knows he would not let anything go that was not good," says Fantine.

When talking about the song "Blá Blá Blá", Rick Bonadio commented, "It really is very daring, it's not an easy song, we felt like we could not make a song that was a repetition of what had already been done. more focused on dance, as "Ragatanga" was, nor anything more playful, as it was "Brilha La Luna"." Karin Hils said, "We really wanted to do something different, and when Rick showed us the song for the first time, we were a little surprised, we thought," Maybe it's too different. "In terms of sonority, there is a bit of Outkast influence. is a group that changed the face of the pop scene," points out Bonadio.

"I wrote a ballad "Pra Sempre Te Amar", which was born with only voice and guitar. I gave Rick the arrangement and he made the music much better (laughs)," Fantine said. "On the new album, the four of us wrote together a song called "Na Palma da Mão", a bustling track full of dance, raggamuffin and hip hop music," says Patricia. "We met at Karin's house to eat pizza and the music came out, kind of jokingly," recalls Aline. "The letter puts us up the hill and inviting people to a party, has a joke with palms, is very fun," Karin emits. "The quality of the Rouge's vocals is increasing, as is the track "Por Onde Quer Que Eu Vá", in which the girls do a thank-you, a tribute to the fans, it's a ballad with gospel touches, with incredible vocals." praises Bonadio.

Critical reception 

The critique of the "Universo Musical" was positive, saying that "In their 3rd album, the girls of the Rouge debut new formation, without Luciana. The remaining Karin, Fantine, Aline and Patricia report the message, recording a disc of more mature lyrics, although the target is still the teen audience and the children and adolescents. They also improve in terms of rhythm, adding pitches of rock to their dance-pop, as in "Blá Blá Blá" (1st track of work, which speaks of gossip ), "Eu Quero Acreditar", "Se Liga, Se Toca", "Como na Primeira Vez" and "Filme de Terror". In the romanticism, highlight to "Vermelho, A Cor do Amor", with beautiful lyrics and a great arrangement of strings. But the very best is for the final: the last track, "Por Onde Quer Que Eu Vá", brings the 4 girls, who usually play together, singing together in a beautiful choir, in a tribute to the fans."

Singles
The Lead single from the album, "Blá Blá Blá" was released on May 4, 2004. The second single of the album, the ballad "Sem Você", was released at the end of July. The song was part of the soundtrack of the soap opera, Esmeralda, from SBT. "Vem Dançar" was released on October 20 as the third single and included in the soundtrack of the film Eliana em o Segredo dos Golfinhos (Eliana and the Secret of the Dolphins). The fourth and last single from the album, "Pá Pá Lá Lá", version of the song "Algo tienes" by Paulina Rubio, was released in December 2004.

Promotion
Blá Bá Blá also had some news to please the children's audience, a booklet with a tutti frutti aroma, a special cover (holographic), a multimedia track where the "fan-mirim" can play and have fun with: 2 games, Karaoke of the single "Blá Blá Blá" and "In the Studio With the Rouge."

Track listing

Certifications

References

2004 albums
Columbia Records albums
Rouge (group) albums
Albums produced by Rick Bonadio